Puffin Island may refer to the following islands:

Canada
Puffin Island (Baccalieu Tickle), Newfoundland and Labrador
Puffin Island (Greenspond), Newfoundland and Labrador

Iceland
From the Icelandic word for puffin:
Lundey, Faxaflói
Lundey, Skagafjörður
Lundey, Skjálfandi

Ireland
Puffin Island (County Kerry)

United Kingdom
Puffin Island (Anglesey), Wales
Lundy (from puffin in Old Norse), in the Bristol Channel

United States
Puffin Island (Alaska)
Puffin Island (Washington), in the San Juan Islands

See also
Puffin Island virus
Puffin (disambiguation)